Empress of China, also known as Chinese Queen, was a three-masted, square-rigged sailing ship of 360 tons, initially built in 1783 for service as a privateer.  After the Treaty of Paris brought a formal end to the American Revolutionary War, the vessel was refitted for commercial purposes. She became the first American ship to sail from the newly independent United States to China, opening what is known today as the Old China Trade and transporting the first official representative of the American government to Canton.

First voyage
The first American merchant vessel to enter Chinese waters left New York harbor on Washington's birthday, February 22, 1784. The Empress returned to New York on May 11, 1785 after a round voyage of 14 months and 24 days. The success of the voyage encouraged others to invest in further trading with China. President Washington bought a set of Chinese porcelain tableware from the ship.

The ship's captain John Green (1736–1796) was a former U.S. naval officer, its two business agents (supercargos), Samuel Shaw (1754–1794) and Thomas Randall (1723–1797), were former officers in the U.S. Continental Army, and its syndicate of owners, including Robert Morris (1734–1806) were some of the richest men in the new nation.

Legacy
 In 1986, China minted a silver 5-yuan to commemorate the voyage of the Empress

See also
 Foreign relations of Imperial China
 RMS Empress of China (1891)

Notes

References
 Giunta, Mary A. and J. Dane Hartgrove. (1998).  Documents of the Emerging Nation. Wilmington, Delaware: Rowman & Littlefield. ; OCLC 37783076
 Smith, Philip Chadwick Foster. (1984).   The Empress of China. Philadelphia: Philadelphia Maritime Museum. ; OCLC 11089953

External links
 Columbia University:  Two Hundred Years of U.S. Trade with China (1784-1984)
 US Dept. of State: Canton Witnesses the 226th Anniversary of The Empress of Chinas Arrival and US-China Trade Relations Kickoff
 Meng, Xingyu Dr. (2014).  The Legend of Empress of China. International Culture and History Project based on the ship Empress of China. 

Sailing ships of the United States
Age of Sail merchant ships of the United States